The Kidney Foundation of Iran is a charitable, nonprofit organization that addresses needs related to renal disease (including dialysis and kidney transplants). It has more than 55,000 members and 157 branches throughout Iran. These forums since 1359 by a number of patients and their families with the assistance of both individuals and medical benefactors formally began its activities. According to the statute, it is built on the principal objectives of the association:

The principal objectives of the association include:
 Education
 Prevention
 Culture
 Art
 Sports
 Health
 Pharmaceuticals
 Medical
 Welfare
 Support

Head Office 

The headquarters is located in Tehran, at Valiasr Street, Taleghani Street, Hosseini Cultural Office, No. 3.

References

External links 
 Kidney Foundation of Iran's official site (Reference site)

Buildings and structures in Tehran
Foundations based in Iran